Florencia Abbate (born December 24, 1976 in Buenos Aires) is an Argentine writer, poet and journalist. She is one of the founders of the feminist collective Ni una menos.

She studied literature at the Universidad de Buenos Aires and has worked for different media, such as "La Nación", "Perfil", "Página 12" or "El país" among others.

She was a participating author of the 2004 editor's week in Buenos Aires.
In 2007, she spent a "virtual year" in Hamilton, Canada.

Works

Novels
 "Magic Resort",  Emecé, Grupo Planeta,  2007. 
 "El grito", Emecé, Grupo Planeta, 2004.

Poetry
 Los transparentes, Editorial Libros del Rojas, 2000, with drawings by Adolfo Nigro.
Una sola alma somos: mapuches, Tantalia, 2006.

Essay
 Él, ella, ¿ella?, apuntes sobre transexualidad masculina, Editorial Perfil, 1998. 
 Gilles Deleuze para principiantes, Editorial Era Naciente, 2001, with drawings by Pablo Páez. 
 Literatura latinoamericana para principiantes, Editorial Era Naciente, 2003, with drawings by Diego Parés.

Short stories
 Una terraza propia, Editorial Norma, 2006
 Puntos de fuga, Editorial Tantalia, 1996. Travel diary
 Las siete maravillas del mundo, Editorial Estrada, 1996. Tales for children

See also
 Lists of writers

References

External links
Florencia Abbate official website
Florencia Abbate (2ª Parte) en "La Anguila Lánguida" Muestra de Poesía 2004

1976 births
21st-century Argentine poets
21st-century Argentine writers
Writers from Buenos Aires
Argentine essayists
Argentine women poets
Argentine women short story writers
Argentine women journalists
Living people
Argentine women essayists
21st-century Argentine short story writers
21st-century essayists
21st-century Argentine women writers